The Fall of Hīt was the capture of the important town of Hīt by ISIL, which cut off the road leading to nearby Haditha.

Events
On October 2, it was reported that a major battle had broken out in the city in Hīt. ISIL claimed that they had taken control of the city, but pro-government fighters said that fighting was ongoing. However, the following day, Iraqi officials said that 90% of the town was not under their control. ISIL flags were reportedly flying on government buildings, including the governor's office and police station. The assault began after a suicide bomber attacked the city, according to Iraqi officials. They looted many tanks and other military equipment as well. There were also unconfirmed reports that they left the town as a result of coalition airstrikes.

On October 5, a suicide bomber detonated an explosive-rigged vehicles into a military checkpoint near the entrance of the city, killing 3 and wounding 5. The suicide bombing took place in the eastern part of the city, and killed Capt. Mohammed Saad as well.

On October 13, ISIL took control of a major military base in the region, after Iraqi forces abandoned it. Coalition airstrikes failed to dislodge the militants, and a large number of refugees left the town. 50% of the population had fled the town due to the airstrikes as well. They retreated to the Asad Airbase, which included many senior officers among them. ISIL captured more equipment, including 3 tanks and other vehicles.

Refugee crisis
During and after the fighting, many people fled Hit and other places in the Anbar Province. According to UN officials, more than 180,000 people were displaced because the fighting, and many have gone to government-held areas of Ramadi. Many civilians were left in need of food, blankets and medical supplies.

War crimes
After the fall of the town, ISIL executed several members of the Albu Nimr tribe, because they had fought against them. Many have been abducted from their homes, and their fate is unknown. However, they are widely believed to be dead. A mass grave was discovered outside the city, which had the bodies of 200 people, and an additional 48 fighters were paraded through the streets before being executed. Despite this, the tribe said that they will try to retake the city.

See also
Fall of Mosul

References

External links
Operation Inherent Resolve Airstrike Updates

Hit
Military operations of the Iraqi Civil War in 2014
Military operations of the War in Iraq (2013–2017) involving the Islamic State of Iraq and the Levant
Military operations of the War in Iraq (2013–2017) involving the United States
October 2014 events in Iraq
Hit